Anita Weyermann (born 8 December 1977 in Wynigen) is a Swiss former middle- and long-distance runner.

She won the 1998 Eurocross meeting. In the 1999 season she began with a win at the Belfast International Cross Country and went on to take the gold at the European Cross Country Championships.

Weyermann retired from professional sports on 5 March 2008. She works as a radio journalist for a Bernese local radio station, Radio BEO, and as a running trainer.

Personal bests

 800 metres: 2:02.73 min, 5 July 1998 in Frauenfeld
 1500 metres: 3:58.20 min, 8 August 1998 in Monaco, Swiss record
 3000 metres: 8:35.83 min, 7 July 1999 in Rome
 5000 metres: 14:59.28 min, 5 June 1996 in Rome

References

External links
 

1977 births
Living people
Swiss female middle-distance runners
Swiss female long-distance runners
Olympic athletes of Switzerland
Athletes (track and field) at the 1996 Summer Olympics
Athletes (track and field) at the 2000 Summer Olympics
World Athletics Championships athletes for Switzerland
World Athletics Championships medalists
European Athletics Championships medalists
European Cross Country Championships winners
People from Emmental District
Sportspeople from the canton of Bern